Teerlink is a surname. Notable people with the surname include:

Abraham Teerlink (1776–1857), Dutch painter
Jan Bekker Teerlink (1759–1832), Dutch winemaker

See also
Teerlinc, surname
Teerlinck, surname

Dutch-language surnames